Reilly Opelka defeated John Isner in the final, 6–3, 7–6(9–7), to win the singles tennis title at the 2022 U.S. Men's Clay Court Championships. It marked Opelka's fourth career Association of Tennis Professionals (ATP) singles title and his first on clay. At the age of 36, Isner was also playing to become the oldest champion at the tournament in the Open Era.

Cristian Garín was the defending champion from when the tournament was last held in 2019, but lost in the semifinals to Isner.

Seeds
The top four seeds received a bye into the second round.

Draw

Finals

Top half

Bottom half

Qualifying

Seeds

Qualifiers

Lucky losers

Qualifying draw

First qualifier

Second qualifier

Third qualifier

Fourth qualifier

References

External links
Main draw
Qualifying draw

US Men's Clay Court Championships – 1
2022 Singles